Suzanne Bassi (born 1945) is a former Republican member of the Illinois House of Representatives, representing the 54th district from 1999 to 2010. Her predecessor was Robert L. Bergman. Bassi lost to Thomas Morrison in the Republican primary on February 2, 2010. In the 2016 Republican Party presidential primaries, Bassi was a delegate pledged to the presidential campaign of John Kasich.

References

External links
Representative Suzanne Bassi (R) 54th District official IL House website
Bills Committees
 

1945 births
Living people
People from Santa Ana, California
Republican Party members of the Illinois House of Representatives
Women state legislators in Illinois
21st-century American politicians
21st-century American women politicians